Giacomo (or, Jacopo) Piscicelli (died 1507) was a Roman Catholic prelate who served as Bishop of Lecce (1502–1507).

Biography
Giacomo, or Jacopo, Piscicelli, was born a member of the  noble neapolitan family.

On 24 March 1502, he was appointed by Pope Alexander VI as Bishop of Lecce. He served as Bishop of Lecce until his death in 1507.

References

External links and additional sources
 (for Chronology of Bishops) 
 (for Chronology of Bishops) 

16th-century Italian Roman Catholic bishops
1507 deaths
Bishops appointed by Pope Alexander VI